Empress Airport  is located  south of Empress, Alberta, Canada.

See also
Empress/McNeill Spectra Energy Aerodrome
Empress Canadian Pacific Railway Station
Empress, Alberta

References

External links
Page about this airport on COPA's Places to Fly airport directory

Registered aerodromes in Alberta
Special Area No. 2